Kani Pasha (also Romanized as Kānī Pāshā) is a village in Dowlatabad Rural District, in the Central District of Ravansar County, Kermanshah Province, Iran. At the 2006 census, its population was 112, in 20 families.

References 

Populated places in Ravansar County